Callionymus regani, Regan’s deepwater dragonet, is a species of dragonet known only from the Saya de Malha Bank in the Indian Ocean at depths of around . The specific name honours the British ichthyologist Charles Tate Regan (1878-1943).

References

External links
View works about Callionymus regani at Biodiversity Heritage Library.

R
Taxa named by Tetsuji Nakabo 
Fish described in 1979